Air Vice-Marshal Sir Tom Ince Webb-Bowen,  (17 January 1879 – 29 October 1956) was a senior commander in the Royal Air Force during the first half of the 20th century.

Early life
Tom Ince Webb-Bowen was born on 17 January 1879, the son of Thomas Ince Webb-Bowen (senior) who served as the Chief Constable of Pembrokeshire Police from 1 January 1879 to 1 December 1906.

RAF career
Webb-Bowen was initially commissioned into a militia battalion of the Middlesex Regiment, later got a regular army commission into the Bedfordshire Regiment and was appointed the Adjutant of the Madras Volunteer Corps while serving in India. Finding himself unsuited to regimental life, Webb-Bowen learnt to fly in 1912. After several weeks as a Royal Flying Corps flight commander, he was posted to the Central Flying School as an instructor where he later served as the Assistant Commandant.

In March 1915 Major Webb-Bowen took over command of No. 2 Squadron while the squadron was located at Merville, France. During his short tenure there were two significant events. Firstly, because of the difficulty suffered by ground troops in communicating their advance to higher command, a technique was developed whereby troops on the ground could convey their position by laying strips of white cloth on the ground. (These strips are referred to as "Popham strips" in a novel, and Webb-Bowen's predecessor was Robert Brooke-Popham.) Aircraft from No. 2 Squadron would then relay by WT the co-ordinates noted. The second and more historically significant event was the award of the first Victoria Cross awarded for bravery in the air, to Lieutenant William Rhodes-Moorhouse. Major Webb-Bowen handed over command to Major Becke in June 1915 following his posting to Home Establishment. He continued his war service commanding No. 3 Wing RFC from May 1915, and then as Brigadier-General Commanding first II Brigade RFC, then VII Brigade RFC and then II Brigade RFC again. He commanded these brigades in France and Italy.

After the war he was appointed Air Officer Commanding South Eastern Area and then Air Officer Commanding RAF India. He was appointed Air Officer Commanding No. 3 Group in 1923, Air Officer Commanding Inland Area in 1924 and Air Officer Commanding Middle East Command in 1925. He then went on to be Air Member for Personnel in 1930 and Air Officer Commanding Wessex Bombing Area in 1931 before retiring on 26 September 1933.

He was recalled during the Second World War to be Duty Air Commodore in the Operations Room at Headquarters Fighter Command.

References

|-

 
|-

|-

|-

|-

|-

|-

|-

|-

|-

1879 births
1956 deaths
Companions of the Order of St Michael and St George
Knights Commander of the Order of the Bath
Officers of the Military Order of Savoy
Recipients of the Order of St. Anna, 3rd class
Recipients of the Croix de Guerre 1914–1918 (France)
Officiers of the Légion d'honneur
Deputy Lieutenants of Pembrokeshire
High Sheriffs of Pembrokeshire
Royal Air Force generals of World War I
Royal Air Force air marshals
Middlesex Regiment officers
Bedfordshire and Hertfordshire Regiment officers
Royal Flying Corps officers